Eunice Musiime is a Ugandan lawyer, feminist and development specialist. She is the current Executive Director of Akina Mama wa Afrika (AMwA).  She is also the chairperson of the Federation of Uganda Women Lawyers (FIDA). In January, 01, 2005, she wrote a frame work report on Organic Agriculture in Uganda with other two authors; Boaz Keizire and Moses Muwanga.

Biography 
Musiime holds a bachelor's degree in Law from University of Dar es Salaam (Tanzania) and a Masters in Business Administration majoring in public policy analysis from the University of Birmingham.

Between 2004–2006, Musiime worked was a research fellow with Advocates Coalition for Development and Environment. She was the head of the department of policy and advocacy at the Uganda Law Society from 2006 to 2010, and chair of FIDA-Uganda from 2014–2016. Musiime is currently Executive Director of Akina Mama wa Afrika (AMwA).

Articles written 

 Unleashing the Leader Within.
 Organic Agriculture in Uganda: The Need for a Coherent Policy Framework

References 

Living people
Ugandan women lawyers
Ugandan feminists
Ugandan non-fiction writers
Development specialists
Ugandan women writers
Year of birth missing (living people)
21st-century Ugandan lawyers